The Armenian Basketball Federation, also known as the Basketball Federation of Armenia (BFA), is the national governing body of basketball in Armenia. The Armenian Basketball Federation operates both the men's national team and the women's national team.

History 

The Armenian Basketball Federation (BFA) was established in 1989 and is headquartered in Yerevan, Armenia. The BFA joined the International Basketball Federation in 1992 and holds full membership in FIBA Europe. Since 2006, Hrachya Rostomyan has been president of the BFA. The BFA manages Armenia's basketball participation in both World and European competitions. In 2016, the BFA organized Armenia's first competition in the FIBA European Championship for Small Countries, with the Armenian team winning the tournament that year.

Armenia qualified to participate in EuroBasket 2022; however, the BFA announced its intentions to withdraw from the competition due to financial constraints.

League A is the top professional league in Armenia.

Activities 
In 2006, Armen Hovhannissian was appointed as a basketball representative of Armenia to the CIS and Baltic states. The Armenian Basketball Federation later opened its first foreign representation in Moscow, headed by Hovhannissian, which was aimed at coordinating Armenia’s basketball cooperation in the region.

Since 2011, the Armenian Basketball Federation has been working actively to recruit Armenian basketball players from all over the world to create teams. In 2015, Ara Poghosyan was nominated to coordinate basketball activities, tournaments, and recruitment across the Armenian Diaspora and to seek competitors to participate in the Pan-Armenian Games.

In September 2018, the BFA helped to organize the EU's European Week of Sports events across Yerevan, in cooperation with the country’s Ministry of Sport and Youth Affairs.

In April 2020, the BFA announced plans to increase marketing campaigns to boost both local and international interest in Armenian basketball.

Presidents 
 Hrant Vardanyan (1989-2002)
 Aristakes Navasardyan (2002-2006)
 Hrachya Rostomyan (2006-present)

See also 

 Armenia men's national basketball team
 Armenia women's national basketball team
 Armenia national under-19 basketball team
 Armenia national under-17 basketball team
 Armenia Basketball League A
 Sport in Armenia

References

External links
Armenian Basketball Federation official website
Armenia at FIBA site
Armenia Basketball Records at FIBA Archive
Armenian Basketball Federation on Facebook
Armenian basketball at EuroBasket.com

Sports governing bodies in Armenia
Basketball in Armenia